The Heart of Juliet Jones is an American comic strip series created by Elliott Caplin and drawn by Stan Drake, beginning on March 9, 1953. The strip was distributed by King Features Syndicate. 

The strip was a soap opera, following the prototype set by Mary Worth but elevated by Drake's exceptional artwork. The strip's first storylines were based on a treatment by writer Margaret Mitchell.  The figure drawing was characterized by Drake's pioneering use of naturalistic movement and expression, a style he achieved partly through the use of Polaroid photographic reference.

Publication history 
Drake's last strip was published May 20, 1989; it was continued by Frank Bolle through the January 1, 2000 strip, which ended the series with an unresolved cliffhanger.

Characters and story
Much of the dramatic tension was realized through the interaction of two dissimilar sisters. Brunette Juliet Jones, the older, was modest, sensible and successful. Buxom blonde Eve Jones was flirty, flighty, and in and out of trouble. Their elderly father Howard, a decent but dull man easily swayed by both of his daughters, also played a leading role. Initially, Eve was more villainous, and tried to steal Juliet's boyfriend (who was also her teacher). However, as the strip progressed, Eve became less selfish and established a good relationship with Juliet.

Books

A full reprinting in book form of Drake's work on the strip was begun by Classic Comics Press in late 2008.
The Heart of Juliet Jones vol. 1, Classic Comics Press, 2009 (Reprints dailies March 8, 1953 - August 13, 1955)
The Heart of Juliet Jones vol. 2, Classic Comics Press, 2009 (Reprints dailies August 15, 1955 - November 30, 1957)
The Heart of Juliet Jones vol. 3, Classic Comics Press, 2010 (Reprints dailies December 2, 1957 - January 23, 1960)
Juliette Jones 1 : 1953-1954, Futuropolis (1984) French edition
Juliette Jones 2 : 1954-1955, Futuropolis (1984) French edition

Awards
Drake received the National Cartoonists Society's Story Comic Strip Award in 1968, 1970 and 1972.

References

Sources
Strickler, Dave. Syndicated Comic Strips and Artists, 1924-1995: The Complete Index. Cambria, California: Comics Access, 1995.

External links
The Heart of Juliet Jones at Don Markstein's Toonopedia. Archived from the original on December 8, 2015.
Frank Bolle Studio

American comic strips
1953 comics debuts
Drama comics
2001 comics endings
Comics about women